The Irodo River is located in northern Madagascar. Near Sadjoavato it formed the Tsingy Rouge, a stone formation of red laterite formed by erosion.

References 

Rivers of Diana Region
Rivers of Madagascar